Nusnäs is a locality situated in Mora Municipality, Dalarna County, Sweden with 729 inhabitants in 2010. It is also a notable producer of Dalarna Horses

References 

Populated places in Dalarna County
Populated places in Mora Municipality